The 2014–15 DFB-Pokal was the 72nd season of the annual German football cup competition. It began on 15 August 2014 with the first of six rounds and ended on 30 May 2015 with the final at the Olympiastadion in Berlin.

Bayern Munich was the two-time defending champions, having defeated Borussia Dortmund in the 2014 final, but were knocked out in the semi-finals by the same team in a penalty shootout.

VfL Wolfsburg won the final against Dortmund 3–1 to win their first title.

Participating clubs
The following 64 teams qualified for the competition:

1 The three regions with the most participating teams in their league competitions (Bavaria, Lower Saxony, Westphalia) are allowed to enter two teams for the competition.
2 As Hesse finalists SV Darmstadt 98 qualified through their league position, Kickers Offenbach were guaranteed a spot regardless of the final result.
3 FV Illertissen qualified as 2nd placed team in the 2013–14 Regionalliga Bayern as winners Bayern Munich II are ineligible to play in the DFB-Pokal.

Schedule
The rounds of the 2014–15 competition were scheduled as follows:
 First round: 15–18 August 2014
 Second round: 28–29 October 2014
 Round of 16: 3–4 March 2015
 Quarter-finals: 7–8 April 2015
 Semi-finals: 28–29 April 2015
 Final: 30 May 2015 at Olympiastadion, Berlin

Draw
The draws for the different rounds were conducted as following: For the first round, the participating teams were split into two pots. The first pot contained all teams which had qualified through their regional cup competitions, the best four teams of the 3. Liga and the bottom four teams of the 2. Bundesliga. Every team from this pot was drawn to a team from the second pot, which contained all remaining professional teams. The teams from the first pot were set as the home team in the process.

The two-pot scenario was also applied for the second round, with the remaining 3. Liga/amateur teams in the first pot and the remaining professional teams in the other pot. Once one pot was empty, the remaining pairings were drawn from the other pot with the first-drawn team for a match serving as hosts. For the remaining rounds, the draw was conducted from just one pot. Any remaining 3. Liga/amateur team was the home team if drawn against a professional team. In every other case, the first-drawn team served as hosts.

Matches

First round
The draw for the first round was on 1 June. Fernanda Brandão and Horst Hrubesch drew the matches.

Second round
The draw for the second round was held on 23 August. Marcus Sorg and Vanessa Huppenkothen drew the matches.
The lowest ranked teams left in the competition were Würzburger Kickers, 1. FC Magdeburg and Kickers Offenbach from the fourth tier of German football

Round of 16
The draw for the round of 16 was held on 29 October. Horst Hrubesch and Judith Rakers drew the matches. The lowest ranked team left in the competition was Kickers Offenbach from level four in German football

Quarter-finals
The draw was made on 8 March 2015. Thomas Schneider and Nia Künzer drew the matches. The lowest ranked team left in the competition was Arminia Bielefeld from the 3. Liga, the third level in German football. The matches will be played on 7–8 April 2015.

Semi-finals
The draw was made on 8 April 2015. Horst Hrubesch and Rico Weiler drew the pairings. The lowest ranked team left in the competition was Arminia Bielefeld from the 3. Liga, the third level in German football. The matches were played on 28–29 April 2015.

Final

Bracket
The following is the bracket which the DFB-Pokal resembled. Numbers in parentheses next to the match score represent the results of a penalty shoot-out. Teams that are bolded advanced on. If "aet" is in parentheses next to a team name, it means that they advanced after extra time. If "p" is in parentheses next to a team name, it means that they advanced after a penalty shoot-out.

References

External links
DFB-Pokal on kicker.de

2014-15
2014–15 in German football cups